Julian Baggini (born 1968) is a philosopher, journalist and the author of over 20 books about philosophy written for a general audience. He is co-founder of The Philosophers' Magazine and has written for numerous international newspapers and magazines. In addition to writing on the subject of philosophy he has also written books on atheism, secularism and the nature of national identity. He is a patron of Humanists UK.

Education
Baggini was born in 1968 in Folkestone, the child of an Italian immigrant father and English mother. He grew up in Kent and was educated at the  Harvey Grammar School, Folkestone, from 1980 until 1987. He later attended Reading University and gained a bachelor's degree in philosophy in 1990.

In 1996 he was awarded a PhD from University College London for a thesis on the philosophy of personal identity.

Baggini is an honorary graduate and honorary research fellow of the University of Kent's department of philosophy.

Career
In 1997 Baggini co-founded The Philosophers' Magazine with Jeremy Stangroom.
In 1999 he was a founder of the Humanist Philosophers' Group, then part of the British Humanists Association. He is also a patron of Humanists UK.

In 2009 Baggini was philosopher-in-residence at Wellington College, a public school in Berkshire. In 2012 he was also commissioned by the National Trust to be the philosopher-in-residence for the White Cliffs of Dover where he was required to reflect on the chalk cliffs and their significance to the national identity.

Baggini is a regular columnist for The Guardian newspaper, Prospect magazine, Financial Times and a columnist and book reviewer for The Wall Street Journal. He has also written for New Humanist magazine, The Week, New Statesman, New York Times and Literary Review.

In addition to writing many books about the history and common themes of philosophy, he has also written more generally about the philosophy of food and the nature of 'Englishness'. He speaks regularly at conferences and schools and has frequently spoken out about living without religion, against the teaching in schools of creationism, a loss of reason, which he asserts is "an enemy of mystery and ambiguity," and the benefits of secular education.

His 2018 book, How The World Thinks: A Global History Of Philosophy received a warm critical reception, with The Scotsman describing it as "ingenious and open-hearted" and the Financial Times a "bold, fascinating book".

In 2019 Baggini was named academic director of the Royal Institute of Philosophy. 

He is a member of the British trade union the Society of Authors and also appears in two novels by Alexander McCall Smith in The Sunday Philosophy Club Series.

Works
How The World Thinks: A Global History Of Philosophy - Granta, 2018 
A Short History of Truth - Quercus, 2017 
The Edge of Reason: A Rational Skeptic in an Irrational World - Yale University Press, 2016 
Freedom Regained: The Possibility of Free Will - Granta Books, 2015
Without God, is Everything Permitted? The 20 Big Questions in Ethics - Quercus,2014
The Ego Trick: What Does It Mean To Be You? - Granta Books, 2011
Really Really Big Questions about Faith - Kingfisher (children's book), 2011 
Should You Judge This Book by Its Cover? - Granta, 2009
The Duck That Won the Lottery: And 99 Other Bad Arguments  (published in paperback in UK as Do They Think You're Stupid?) - Granta, 2008  
Complaint: From Minor Moans to Principled Protests  - Profile Books, 2008.  
Welcome to Everytown: a journey into the English mind  - Granta, 2007.
The Ethics Toolkit: A Compendium of Ethical Concepts and Methods, Blackwell, 2007 (co-written with Peter S. Fosl)  
Do You Think What You Think You Think?  - Granta, 2006 (co-written with Stangroom, J.)
The Pig that Wants to be Eaten and 99 other thought experiments  - Granta, 2005.
What’s It All about? Philosophy and the meaning of life  - Granta, 2004.
Making Sense: Philosophy Behind the Headlines  - Oxford University Press, 2002.
Atheism: A Very Short Introduction  - Oxford University Press, 2003.  
Philosophy: Key Themes  - Palgrave Macmillan, 2002.
The Philosopher's Toolkit: A Compendium of Philosophical Concepts and Methods  - Blackwell, 2002 (co-written with Peter S. Fosl)  
Great Thinkers A-Z  - Continuum, 2004 (co-written with Stangroom, J. (eds.))
What Philosophers Think  - Continuum, 2003 (co-written with Stangroom, J. (eds.))
New British Philosophy: The interviews  - Routledge, 2002 (co-written with L.Alpeart (eds.)).

References

External links

Baggini on the BBC History Extra podcast

1968 births
Living people
Atheist philosophers
English atheists
British republicans
21st-century English philosophers
Alumni of University College London
English social commentators
British humanists
British secularists
Alumni of the University of Reading
Critics of creationism